Christopher Middleton (10 June 1926 – 29 November 2015) was a British poet and translator, especially of German literature.

Life
He was born John Christopher Middleton in Truro, Cornwall, in 1926. Following four years' service in the Royal Air Force, he studied at Merton College, Oxford, matriculating in 1948. He then held academic positions at the University of Zürich and King's College London. In 1966 he took up a position as Professor of Germanic Languages & Literature at the University of Texas, Austin, retiring in 1998. Middleton has published translations of Robert Walser, Nietzsche, Hölderlin, Goethe, Gert Hofmann and many others. He has received various awards, including the Geoffrey Faber Memorial Prize and the Schlegel-Tieck Prize for translation.

Middleton married Mary Freer in 1953; they had two daughters and a son. They divorced in 1969. Middleton died on 29 November 2015.

Works
The Pigeons and the Girls (unknown)
Poems (1944)
Nocturne in Eden (1945)
The Vision of a Drowned Man (1949)
Torse 3 (1962)
Nonsequences (1965)
Our Flowers & Nice Bones (1969)
The Fossil Fish (1970)
Briefcase History (1972)
The Lonely Suppers of W. V. Balloon (1975)
Pataxanadu and Other Prose (1977) 
 Céleste, Orange Export Ltd., collection Chutes (1977)
Bolshevism in Art and Other Expository Writings (1978) essays
Carminalenia (1980)
The Pursuit of the Kingfisher (Carcanet Press, 1983) essays
111 Poems (Carcanet Press, 1983)
Serpentine (1984)
 Two Horse Wagon going by (Carcanet Press, 1986)
Selected Writings (Carcanet Press, 1989)
The Balcony Tree (Carcanet Press, 1992)
On a Photograph of Chekhov (1995)
Intimate Chronicles (Carcanet Press, 1996)
The Swallow Diver (1997)
Jackdaw Jiving (Carcanet Press, 1998)
The Redbird Hexagon (1999)
Faint Harps and Silver Voices: Selected Translations (Carcanet Press, 2000)
Twenty Tropes for Doctor Dark (2000)
The Word Pavilion and Selected Poems (Carcanet Press, 2001)
The Anti-Basilisk (Carcanet Press, 2005)
Collected Poems (Carcanet Press, 2008)
Collected Later Poems (Carcanet Press, 2014)

Translations
Selected Stories by Robert Walser (Carcanet Press, 1988) 
The Spectacle at the Tower by Gert Hofmann (Carcanet Press, 1988)
Our Conquest by Gert Hofmann (Carcanet Press, 1988)
The Parable of the Blind by Gert Hofmann (Fromm International, 1989)

External links
Profile at Carcanet Press
Profile at Poetry Archive

References

Academics of King's College London
People from Truro
Poets from Cornwall
1926 births
2015 deaths
German–English translators
Alumni of Merton College, Oxford
20th-century translators